Cham-e Qahreman (also Romanized as Cham-e Qahremān; also known as Bon Tūmān-e Do) is a village in Mamulan Rural District, Mamulan District, Pol-e Dokhtar County, Lorestan Province, Iran. At the 2006 census, its population was 46, in 10 families.

References 

Towns and villages in Pol-e Dokhtar County